An authoritarian enclave is a non-democratic subunit of a democratic system. It may be an administrative division of a state or a ministry (such as the military, education or media).

References

Political science terminology
Authoritarianism
Democracy